The 1868 Franklin by-election was a by-election held on 2 July 1868 in the  electorate during the 4th New Zealand Parliament.

The by-election was caused by the resignation of the incumbent MP Robert Graham on 25 May 1868.

The by-election was won by William Turnbull Swan.

Results

References

Franklin 1868
1868 elections in New Zealand
Politics of the Auckland Region
July 1868 events
1860s in Auckland